Claudio Vandelli is an Italian cyclist. He won the gold medal in Men's team time trial at the 1984 Summer Olympics

References

1961 births
Living people
Italian male cyclists
Olympic gold medalists for Italy
Cyclists at the 1984 Summer Olympics
Olympic cyclists of Italy
Olympic medalists in cycling
Sportspeople from Modena
Medalists at the 1984 Summer Olympics
Cyclists from Emilia-Romagna